Bonelliida is a suborder of the order Echiuroidea, an order of polychaete worms.

Families
The following families are classified within the suborder:

 Bonelliidae Lacaze-Duthiers, 1858
 Ikedidae Bock, 1942

References

Echiurans